Chemerna is a rural locality (a settlement) in Klintsovsky District, Bryansk Oblast, Russia. The population was 1,269 as of 2010. There are 18 streets.

Geography 
Chemerna is located 6 km north of Klintsy (the district's administrative centre) by road. Melyakovka and Klintsy are the nearest rural localities.

References 

Rural localities in Klintsovsky District